" is the symbol for double quotation mark, a punctuation mark used in pairs in various writing systems to set off direct speech, a quotation, or a phrase. 

" may also refer to:
Double prime (″), used for:
Inch, a unit of length in the United States customary and the obsolete (British) Imperial systems of measurement
Arcsecond, a fraction of an arcminute
Ditto mark (〃), a typographic symbol indicating that the word(s) or figure(s) above it are to be repeated
Gershayim (״), a typographical mark in the Hebrew language
Modifier letter double apostrophe (ˮ), a modifier letter used in Tundra Nenets and Dan language